Hendrik Victor "Rik" Isemborghs (30 January 1914 in Antwerp – 9 March 1973) was a Belgian footballer. He played for Royal Beerschot AC and the Belgium national football team. He appeared in the 1938 FIFA World Cup, and scored a goal in Belgium's only game.

References
 
 
 
 

1914 births
1973 deaths
1938 FIFA World Cup players
Belgian footballers
Belgium international footballers
Footballers from Antwerp
Association football forwards